Toni Erdmann is a 2016 German-Austrian comedy-drama film directed, written and co-produced by Maren Ade. It stars Peter Simonischek and Sandra Hüller.

The film, which premiered in competition at the Cannes Film Festival, was named the best film of 2016 by Sight & Sound and other respected cinema magazines. It received near-universal acclaim from critics for Ade's direction, performances, and writing.

It won five awards at the 29th European Film Awards: Best Film (a first for a film directed by a woman), Best Director, Best Screenwriter, Best Actor, and Best Actress. It also won the European Parliament LUX Prize. It was nominated for the Best Foreign Language Film at the 89th Academy Awards, but lost to Iran's The Salesman.

Plot
Winfried Conradi is a divorced music teacher from Aachen with a passion for bizarre pranks involving several fake personas. Following the death of his beloved dog, he decides to reconnect with his daughter, Ines, who is pursuing a career in business consulting. Ines is working in Bucharest, Romania, on an outsourcing project in the oil industry. Consumed by her work, she seems to have little time for her family.

Winfried spontaneously travels to Bucharest and waits for Ines in the lobby of an office complex. After several hours, she finally appears, accompanied by several of her client's board members and on the way to a meeting. Winfried puts on sunglasses and fake teeth as a playful disguise, and approaches the group from the side while hiding behind a newspaper. Ines ignores him, but meets with him briefly after work and invites him to a business reception at the US Embassy.

In the evening, Winfried and Ines attend the reception, where they meet Henneberg, a German oil company CEO with whom Ines wishes to secure a consulting contract. Ines tries to gain Henneberg's attention, but Henneberg seems more interested in her father. Winfried tells Henneberg that he has hired a replacement daughter because Ines is always busy. To Ines's surprise, Henneberg invites Winfried and Ines for drinks, along with his entourage. At the bar, Henneberg once again brushes Ines aside and makes fun of Winfried.

After several days, Ines and Winfried are struggling to get along. Stressed out from work, Ines oversleeps, missing a planned rendezvous with clients, and blames her father for not waking her up. Feeling alienated and unwanted, he leaves in a taxi for the airport. Ines continues with her work as normal, and several days later arranges to meet two female friends at a bar. While Ines and her friends are chatting, a man approaches and introduces himself as "Toni Erdmann". The man is clearly Winfried in a wig and false teeth, but Ines does not let on. Her two friends politely engage "Erdmann" in conversation; he explains that he is a "life coach" and consultant visiting Bucharest to attend the funeral of his friend's turtle.

Ines is increasingly frustrated and unfulfilled in her work and personal life, but continues to encounter "Erdmann" sporadically at parties or outside her office. At first Ines is angry with her father, and accuses him of trying to "ruin" her, but as time goes on she comes to see the value of her father's interventions in her life, and plays along with the ruse. "Erdmann" accompanies her on a night out with her work friends, and eventually even accompanies her to a business meeting. In turn, "Erdmann" takes Ines to a Romanian family's Easter party, where he forces her into a reluctant performance of Whitney Houston's "Greatest Love of All". After singing, Ines promptly rushes off.

Back at her flat, Ines is preparing to host a business team-building brunch to celebrate her birthday. She struggles to zip up her tight dress, realizes her shoes don't match, and attempts to change clothes. The doorbell rings. Instead of redressing, or changing her outfit, she opens the door wearing only her underpants. The first guest is her friend Steph, who offers to help her get dressed. Ines refuses, and when the next guest arrives she spontaneously removes her underpants and answers the door naked, telling her guests that her birthday brunch is a "naked party". Each of them reacts differently, with some leaving in disgust while others self-consciously strip. As the party becomes increasingly awkward, Winfried arrives dressed in a full-body Bulgarian kukeri costume. The costume first scares, then amuses, the partygoers, and Winfried soon leaves. Ines follows him. Outside in a public park, they hug, Winfried still in costume.

Months later, Ines returns to Germany for her grandmother's funeral. She has quit her job in Bucharest and will shortly begin a new one in Singapore. While talking with Winfried in the garden, Ines grabs the fake teeth from his shirt pocket and puts them on. Winfried says he wants to take a photo and goes to get his camera, leaving Ines alone in the garden.

Cast
 Peter Simonischek as Winfried Conradi / Toni Erdmann
 Sandra Hüller as Ines Conradi
 Ingrid Bisu as Anca
 Lucy Russell as Steph
 Michael Wittenborn as Henneberg
 Thomas Loibl as Gerald
 Trystan Pütter as Tim
 Hadewych Minis as Tatjana
 Vlad Ivanov as Iliescu
 Victoria Cocias as Flavia
 Ingrid Burkhard as Grandma Annegret
 Klara Höfels as Irma

Production
The character of Winfried was loosely based on Ade's own father, who wore a pair of fake teeth she gave him as a gag gift to play practical jokes. She was also influenced by the comedian Andy Kaufman's alter ego Tony Clifton.

Ade set the film in Bucharest in part because many German companies had begun to do business there at the end of the Communist era, with many foreign consultants sent to "change the system" and help businesses turn a profit. "And I like the new wave of Romanian films right now, too. So it’d be fun to work there."

Release
Toni Erdmann had its world premiere at the 2016 Cannes Film Festival. The film was originally accepted into the festival's less prestigious Un Certain Regard section, but the night before the April press conference Ade and her producer were informed that it had been selected to compete for the Palme d'Or. Shortly thereafter, Sony Pictures Classics and Thunderbird Releasing acquired US, Latin American and UK distribution rights to the film, respectively.

The film went on to screen at the Filmfest München on 23 June 2016; Sydney Film Festival on 15 June 2016; Karlovy Vary International Film Festival on 3 July 2016; Telluride Film Festival on 2 September 2016; Toronto International Film Festival on 8 September 2016; New York Film Festival on 2 October 2016; and the BFI London Film Festival on 8 October 2016.

The film was released in Germany on 14 July 2016, Austria on 15 July 2016, and Switzerland on 21 July 2016. The film was released in the United States on 25 December 2016.

Genre 
Critics have generally described the film as a comedy-drama. Ade said she thought the story "always had both genres within it, because [Winfried is] playing a comedy for [Ines], but he’s doing it out of desperation." In writing the script, Ade was interested in the film's comedic potential, though she had doubts during the filming. "Then, when we edited the film, I found that the comedy was even stronger because we took things so seriously. For example, in scenes like the naked party where the boss is standing at the door, it was really necessary in terms of comedy for it to be as existential as possible" with the "actor not thinking of it as a comedy."

Hüller said that she always thinks "about how humor works" and it was this question "we were asking ourselves during the process. What is it that makes people laugh? What is funny about Toni? I think...desperation...is the origin of comedy." Falling out of a chair is "the oldest joke." But even when things don't work, "you really have to try, seriously. I think that’s what we did — you never have to play the joke."

Reception

Box office
Toni Erdmann opened on July 14, 2016, in Germany and was watched by 752,000 domestic viewers that year. The movie was widely advertised through all public media channels and became the 40th most watched movie in Germany in 2016.

Critical response
The film received universal acclaim from critics. It holds a 93% approval rating on review aggregator website Rotten Tomatoes, based on 234 reviews, with an average rating of 8.3/10. The website's critical consensus reads, "Toni Erdmann pairs carefully constructed, three-dimensional characters in a tenderly funny character study that's both genuinely moving and impressively ambitious." On Metacritic, the film holds a rating of 93 out of 100, based on 36 reviews, indicating "universal acclaim".

The film was named the best film of the year by the French magazine Cahiers du cinéma. The British film magazine Sight & Sound also named it the best film of 2016 in its poll of 163 critics worldwide. In a 2016 international critics' poll conducted by BBC, the film along with Requiem for a Dream and the film version of Carlos tied for the 100th greatest motion picture since 2000. It also topped the American magazine Film Comment Best Films of 2016 poll. The New York Times’s chief film critics, A. O. Scott and Manohla Dargis, included it on their lists.

Accolades
Toni Erdmann received the FIPRESCI Award for Best Film In Competition at the 2016 Cannes Film Festival.

In August 2016, the film won the FIPRESCI (International Federation of Film Critics)'s Grand Prix for best film of the year, the first time this accolade has been awarded to a female filmmaker.

Later that year, in November 2016, the film was awarded the European Parliament's Lux Prize, annually awarded to facilitate the diffusion of European films in the European Union.

Proposed remake
On February 7, 2017, Variety announced that Paramount Pictures had signed Jack Nicholson and Kristen Wiig for an American remake of the film, with Adam McKay, Will Ferrell, and Jessica Elbaum as producers. In August 2018, Nicholson and producer Lena Dunham withdrew from the movie, effectively stalling its development.

See also
 List of submissions to the 89th Academy Awards for Best Foreign Language Film
 List of German submissions for the Academy Award for Best Foreign Language Film

References

External links
  
  
 
 
 
 
 Official screenplay

2016 films
2016 comedy-drama films
2010s German-language films
2010s English-language films
Austrian comedy-drama films
German comedy-drama films
English-language Austrian films
English-language German films
2010s Romanian-language films
Films about families
Films directed by Maren Ade
Films set in Bucharest
Films shot in Bucharest
Films shot in Germany
Independent Spirit Award for Best Foreign Film winners
Sony Pictures Classics films
Films about father–daughter relationships
2010s German films
2016 multilingual films
Austrian multilingual films
German multilingual films